Cannabis in Botswana is legal since 2017. Cannabis is commonly termed motokwane regionally and in Botswana.

References

Botswana
Politics of Botswana
Society of Botswana